is a Japanese original net animation anime series produced by Studio Colorido and released on YouTube by The Pokémon Company. It is a series inspired by the Pokémon Sword and Shield titles of the Pokémon video games, but it is not a part of the television series, similar to the preceding animations Origins and Generations. A total of eight episodes, were announced for the series on December 12, 2019. The first episode was released on January 15, 2020, and further episodes were planned to be released on a monthly basis, however the fifth episode was delayed from May to June due to the COVID-19 pandemic. This series, for the first seven episodes, also serves as a prequel to the Sword and Shield titles.

The series initially concluded on August 6, 2020, when the seventh episode was released. However, a special episode titled "The Gathering of Stars", based on downloadable content for the Pokémon Sword and Shield games, The Isle of Armor and The Crown Tundra, premiered on November 5, 2020 in Japanese, and later on November 17, 2020 in English.

Episode list

Characters and voice cast

Criticism
Certain species of Pokémon that were initially cut from appearing in the Sword and Shield games (such as Dewgong) appeared in the fourth episode of the animated series, resulting in various fans feeling misled. In response, The Pokémon Company issued a public apology.

Notes

References

External links
 

Official playlist on YouTube

2020 anime ONAs
Anime television series based on video games
Twilight Wings
Studio Colorido
YouTube original programming
YouTube Premium original series
Anime postponed due to the COVID-19 pandemic
Anime productions suspended due to the COVID-19 pandemic
Prequel television series